Gurpreet Singh Dhuri (born 26 December 1983) is an Indian sculptor, hailing from the Ghanaur Khurd Dhuri area of Punjab. Gurpreet Dhuri is known for his clay modeling and portraiture in medium of sculpture. Gurpreet Singh Dhuri loves to be called Gurpreet Dhuri and alumni of Government College of Arts, Chandigarh. His upbringing in a working-class family has taught him to be tough and work passionately to rise. But unlike many who shared similar socio economic background, he has not given up to destiny. He is a contemporary sculptor and prost artist who has worked in Punjab, Chandigarh, Delhi and Mumbai. Completed his Graduation and masters of Fine art BFA and MFA from Government College of Arts Chandigarh. He has worked as artist at dirty Hands studio for a period of five years where he was trained in pros. 
He is founder member of Studio hash, Delhi among other fellow artist Rake Kumar, Harpree Singh, Akash’s Gauir. Recently they have done a full figure Sili Sculpture of Shri Nek Chand maker of Rock Garden of Chandigarh.


Early life and background
Born on 26 December 1983, to mother Joginder Kaur and father Labh Singh, he is the youngest among his four siblings. Father tried to carry forward the traditional shoe making, his ancestral occupation in the small village Ghanaur for many years. But, with the advent of the new technology and new trends in shoe industry, his occupation was subject to constant economic pressures. He somehow delayed his surrender to the time when, Gurpreet dhuri was of 
age). The father finally gave up and took on to his bicycle and tiffin box to join the contingent of laborers working in the Sugar mill at Dhuri. This shift somehow ensured the continuity of studies of his children as the fixed salary of the sugar mill started flowing in. The meager income of the father was not in a capacity to provide a carefree childhood to Gurpreet, he had to think of taking of a few hours of work to be of some help to his family. His passion for colours and painting drove him to work with Rink Painter as an assistant. Here he had his first stint with the paints. Though, the job may not be considered as some higher form of art in the modern sense, but it was how the common men needed art in their lives. Dhuri learned, the techniques to handle Poster and enamel paints over clothes, walls and metal sheets etc. “By the time I passed my matriculation, I had already realized that I have a special attraction towards art pieces, though I was not aware of the dimensions and scope of this area as a sphere of human activity." Gurpreet Dhur informs. The knowledge of art as a field of academic came with small and sudden incident. "One day my elder brother Gurmeet came to me with a piece of newspaper cutting in his hand, and showed it to me saying that it may interest me. Unable to make out any much sense out of it, I took it to my primary teacher, who explained that it is an advertisement for admission to college of art. I immediately knew that it was my destiny." Remembers Gurpree, who still maintains that newspaper cutting in his scraps along with his important documents. This incident gave him a near target in life and he now had a purpose in everything which he was, though, already doing. After passing 10 plus 2 in the year 2000 he still had to look for work. He found work with Rinku painter dhuri and recalls writing banners for advertisements and political parties during election days. This job had another mile to go along with him.

Education
He joined graduation in a nearby college in the year 2001, which he left in the year 2002 when he cleared the entrance test for the government College of Arts in July 2003. The art college was a new world but he could not afford to submerse himself into it fully due to the economic constraints. He took a bus every Friday to travel 128 km to his home town Dhuri so that he can utilize the weekend to earn by painting banners. As he progressed in his studies, many recognized the sculptor within him and he started getting some commercial work in the college sphere itself by the third year of education.  “I met many kind people, who were always ready to help, promote and encourage me. Most notably Mr. Rahi Mohinder Singh, painter and Sant Singh Dhuri, Rinku Painter Dhuri & Jagdeep Jolly" . Dhuri further joined MFA after graduating in the year 2006 and completed the masters in 2009.

Awards and honors
 In 2008 Gurpreet Dhuri received Rabindranath Tagore Scholarship sponsored by late Mrs. Amita Mundra from Lalit Kala Akademi Chandigarh
 2008‘Indo-Swiss Friendship’ Art Exhibition, Government Museum and Art Gallery, Chandigarh.

Career
By the time he completed MFA, he had realized the length and breadth of the big field of sculpture and art he was about to plunge into. He was not very keen to find a job and look for a quick settlement in the most mundane sense, instead, he set out to explore. He started experimenting with new materials like silicone and proceeded towards good results which invited attention of many.

Style themes and influences
At present, Gurpreet Dhuri working in Delhi with several Metal and Clay Projects.

References

1983 births
Living people
21st-century Indian sculptors
Prosthetics
Government College of Art, Chandigarh alumni